Attention Deficit is the debut studio album by American rapper Wale. It was released on November 10, 2009, by Allido Records and Interscope Records. The production on the album was handled by multiple producers including Mark Ronson, Cool & Dre, The Neptunes, J.U.S.T.I.C.E. League and  David Sitek among others. The album also features guest appearances by Lady Gaga, Gucci Mane, J. Cole, Pharrell Williams and Jazmine Sullivan among others.

Attention Deficit was supported by three singles: "Chillin", "World Tour" and "Pretty Girls". The album received generally positive reviews from music critics and received moderate commercial success. It debuted at number 21 on the US Billboard 200 chart, selling 28,000 copies in its first week.

Singles 
The album's lead single "Chillin" featuring Lady Gaga, was released on April 14, 2009. The song was a charter hit. It peaked at number 12 on the UK Singles Chart on the chart ending September 12, 2009. It also spent a total of 6 weeks on the chart. This is Wale's highest-charting single in the United Kingdom.

The album's second single "World Tour" featuring Jazmine Sullivan, was released on September 8, 2009.

The album's third single "Pretty Girls" featuring Gucci Mane and Weensey (of Backyard Band), was released on October 6, 2009.

Critical reception 

Attention Deficit received generally favorable reviews from music critics. At Metacritic, which assigns a normalized rating out of 100 to reviews from mainstream critics, the album received an average score of 77, based on 21 reviews, which indicates "generally favorable". David Jeffries of AllMusic gave the album a favorable review. The A.V. Clubs Nathan Rabin gave the album a B+ rating.

Commercial performance
Attention Deficit debuted at number 21 on the US Billboard 200 chart, selling 28,000 copies in its first week. As of November 2011, the album has sold over 200,000 copies in the United States, according to Nielsen Soundscan.

Track listing 

Samples credits
"Pretty Girls" contains a sample of Backyard Band's go-go rendition of "Girls" by The Moments & Whatnauts
"Chillin" contains a sample of "Na Na Hey Hey Kiss Him Goodbye" by Steam
"Mama Told Me" contains a sample of "Summer Madness" by Kool and the Gang
"Contemplate" contains a sample of "Question Existing" from the album Good Girl Gone Bad by Rihanna
"Diary" contains a sample of "La Valse d'Amélie" by Yann Tiersen
"My Sweetie" contains a sample of "Let Me Love You" by Bunny Mack
"Beautiful Bliss" contains a sample of "(Do It, Do It) No One Does It Better" by The Spinners and "Theme Music to a Drive By" By Lupe Fiasco
"World Tour" contains a sample of "Award Tour" by A Tribe Called Quest
"Prescription" contains an interpolated sample of "Modaji" by Dave Grusin

Charts

Weekly charts

Year-end charts

References 

2009 debut albums
Albums produced by Mark Ronson
Albums produced by Cool & Dre
Albums produced by DJ Green Lantern
Albums produced by the Neptunes
Albums produced by Dave Sitek
Albums produced by Best Kept Secret (production team)
Interscope Records albums
Wale (rapper) albums